Commander Edward Leslie Dayrell Bartley (2 March 1896 – 7 October 1969) was an English first-class cricketer. He was a left-handed batsman who played primarily as a wicket-keeper.

Bartley made his first-class debut for the Royal Navy against the Army in 1914. His next first-class appearance came after the First World War in 1919, where he represented the Royal Navy until 1924. In 1924 he represented the Combined Services in a first-class match against the touring South Africans.

In late 1924 Bartley toured South Africa with S. B. Joel's XI, which was captained by Lord Tennyson. Bartley played in 12 of the 14 first-class matches on the tour.

From 1925 to 1927 Bartley played five first-class matches for the Royal Navy, the last of which came during the 1927 season against the Royal Air Force.

Bartley joined Hampshire in 1931, playing three matches during the season. He made his debut for Hampshire against the touring New Zealanders. Bartley played two more matches for the club against Gloucestershire and Glamorgan.

Bartley's final first-class match came for the Combined Services against the touring New Zealanders in 1931.

In his first-class career Bartley played 27 matches, scoring 649 runs at an average of 20.28. He made four half centuries, with a highest score of 84 which came against the Army. Behind the stumps he took 43 catches and made 19 stumpings.

Bartley died at the Royal Naval Hospital in Plymouth, Devon on 7 October 1969.

External links
Edward Bartley at Cricinfo
Edward Bartley at CricketArchive

1896 births
1969 deaths
Sportspeople from Stockport
English cricketers
Royal Navy cricketers
Combined Services cricketers
Hampshire cricketers
English cricketers of 1919 to 1945
S. B. Joel's XI cricketers
Wicket-keepers